"Metropolis" is a song by Australian alternative rock band the Church. It was released as the lead single from their sixth album, Gold Afternoon Fix (1990), and the songwriting credits were given to all four members of the band. The song topped the US Billboard Modern Rock Tracks chart and reached number 19 in Australia. A music video directed by David Hogan and produced by Chris O'Brien was made for the song.

Background and composition
Marty Willson-Piper, Peter Koppes, Richard Ploog, and Steve Kilbey were all credited with writing the song. The lead guitar produced a quickly falling then softly ascending melody, with slight commercial influence. A complicated web of guitar overdubs appears later in the song, and a soft, mandolin-sounding melody was added as an additional hook.

Release and reception
"Metropolis" peaked at number one on the US Billboard Modern Rock Tracks chart and number 11 on the Album Rock Tracks chart in 1990. In addition, it peaked at number 19 in Australia and number 41 in New Zealand. The song was well received by critics upon its release. Ned Raggett of Allmusic praised "the almost desperate edge in Steve Kilbey's vocals" as a testament to the song's quality. Raggett added that the Church's "ear for a triumphant yet somehow downbeat ending [makes] this an underrated gem in the band's body of work."

Track listings

Australian and US 7-inch single
A. "Metropolis" – 4:44
B. "Much Too Much" – 4:46

Australian maxi-CD single
 "Metropolis"
 "Much Too Much"
 "Ride into the Sunset"

UK 7-inch single
A. "Metropolis"
B. "Monday Morning"

UK and European maxi-CD single
 "Metropolis" – 4:44
 "Monday Morning" – 2:44
 "Much Too Much" – 3:50

Credits and personnel
Credits are lifted from the Australian 7-inch single and Gold Afternoon Fix liner notes.

Studio
 Recorded at Ocean Way Recording Studios (Los Angeles)
 Pre-produced at S.I.R. (Los Angeles) and Fat Boy Studios (Sydney, Australia)
 Mastered at Artisan Sound Recorders (Los Angeles)

Personnel

 The Church – production
 Steve Kilbey – writing, vocals, bass, keyboards
 Marty Willson-Piper – writing, guitar
 Peter Koppes – writing, guitar
 Richard Ploog – writing, drums
 Waddy Wachtel – production, mixing
 Shep Lonsdale – mixing, engineering
 Joe Schiff – assistant engineering
 Greg Fulginiti – mastering

Charts

Acoustic versions
The band performed the song, as well as "Under the Milky Way", for MTV Unplugged on 30 January 1990 at the National Video Center in New York City. The episode aired 18 March 1990. An acoustic version was included on the 2004 album El Momento Descuidado.

References

1990 singles
1990 songs
Arista Records singles
The Church (band) songs
Mushroom Records singles
Songs written by Steve Kilbey